Levi Duchman is the first resident chief rabbi of the United Arab Emirates. Since his arrival in the UAE in 2014, he has established Jewish communities in Abu Dhabi and Dubai, and a number of Jewish institutions and services, including numerous places of worship, the government-approved Kashrut certification, a Jewish education system from early childhood to adults, business networking and relocation services, and rich community life. He also serves as the head of the Jewish congregation of Abu Dhabi of the Jewish Community Center of UAE in Dubai, and a member of the executive board of the Alliance of Rabbis in Islamic States.

Rabbinical career

Rabbi Duchman has been establishing Jewish institutions and services for the local Jewish community and Jewish visitors across the UAE since 2014. It was in 2019, following the Abraham Accords signed with Israel, that the UAE leadership gave its official recognition to the local Jewish community.

As the UAE's resident rabbi, Duchman received the first rabbinical license, license 001.

He is an executive board member of the Alliance of Rabbis in Islamic States. He has visited many other countries in Arabia, including Kuwait, Bahrain, and Oman. He was responsible for fixing the Mezuzah on the Israeli–UAE Embassy in Abu Dhabi.

Kashrut in UAE
Rabbi Duchman founded the UAE's official Kosher Certification, the first to be fully licensed by the UAE authorities. Emirates Agency for Kosher Certification (EAKC) is the first legal entity responsible for the assessment of foods, products, processes and services to ensure compliance with Orthodox Jewish dietary laws. Armani/Kaf is the UAE's first Glatt Kosher Restaurant open in Dubai's Burj Khalifa, supervised under the EAKC. Rabbi Levi Duchman has awarded kosher certificates to slaughterhouses, and provides kosher food for restaurants, hotels, and food factories.

One thousand EAKC certified kosher chickens per week are provided to the community by local Shechita. In May 2020, it was reported that the JCC of the UAE has imported the largest kosher meat shipment in the history of the community.

Duchman assisted the Staff of Mohamed Bin Zayed with establishing Kosher Meals for a meeting between the Prince and Yair Lapid.

In May 2022, Rabbi Duchman was invited by UAE President Sheikh Mohammed bin Zayed Al Nahyan to extend his condolences on the passing of the late Sheikh Khalifa bin Zayed Al Nahyan at the Presidential Palace, on behalf of the world's Jewish community. Rabbi Duchman thanked the UAE leadership for its longstanding support of the Jewish UAE community and for its promotion of tolerance and coexistence across the Emirates and the region.

Personal life
Levi Duchman is the son of Feiga and Rabbi Shalom Duchman, director of the Colel Chabad.
Duchman is fluent in 5 languages, including Arabic and French.

His brother Mendel is a Schochet in Al-Ain and the Rabbi of the Jewish community in Downtown Dubai.

In September 2022, Duchman married Lea Hadad, a Belgian woman of Jewish Moroccan descent, in the UAE's largest Jewish wedding to date. Around 1500 people attended, including prominent Emiratis.

See also
 History of the Jews in the United Arab Emirates

References

External links
  
Rabbi Levi Duchman on LinkedIn
Rabbi Levi Duchman at Mushrif Palace in Abu Dhabi after the death of Sheikh Khalifa bin Zayed Al Nahyan
Rabbi Levi Duchman on the ‘largest ever Seder’ for the UAE Jewish community
The Abraham Accords Are Changing Rabbi Levi Duchman-s Life in the UAE

Living people
Emirati rabbis
Year of birth missing (living people)
Place of birth missing (living people)
Chabad-Lubavitch emissaries
Chief rabbis